Vanemuine Concert Hall is a concert hall in Tartu, Estonia. The hall is located next to Vanemuine Theatre. The hall is managed by Eesti Kontsert.

The hall was built in 1970. The hall was designed by architects August Volberg, Peeter Tarvas and Uno Tölpus. In 1998, the hall was renovated (architect Avo Kuldkepp). In 2001, the hall's extension was finished.

References

Concert halls in Estonia
Buildings and structures in Tartu